Fort Gaines may refer to:

Fort Gaines, Georgia, a city located in Clay County, Georgia
Fort Gaines (Alabama), a fort on Dauphin Island
Fort Gaines, Maryland, an American Civil War-era fort that defended the northeastern approaches to Washington, D.C.